Umeå IK is a professional association football club based in the city of Umeå, in northern Sweden, and currently playing Damallsvenskan, the first tier of women's football in Sweden.

They were one of the most successful football clubs in the world in the early 2000s, winning seven Swedish championships between 2000 and 2008, four Swedish Cups (2001, 2002, 2003 and 2007) and the UEFA Women's Champions League twice, in 2003 and 2004. They also reached the Champions League finals in 2002, 2007 and 2008. A number of Swedish and international stars played for the club during that period, most notably Brazilian star Marta.

Umeå IK play their home games at Umeå energi arena (formerly known as Gammliavallen) in Umeå. The team colours are black and yellow. The club is affiliated to the Västerbottens Fotbollförbund.

History  
Established in 1917 as a general sports club, the women's football
section began competing in 1985 in the Swedish fourth division. In 1986, they won the division and were promoted to the third division. In 1991, the club began paying its players, 35kr per game, and implemented a more regular training schedule than other Swedish teams in the hopes of turning the team into a European contender.

In 1996 the team reached the Premier Division (Damallsvenskan) only to be relegated the following year. In 1998 they were promoted again. The years following the second promotion saw an enormous amount of success for the club, winning seven Swedish championships in 9 years (2000, 2001, 2002, 2005, 2006, 2007 and 2008). In the 2003 FIFA Women's World Cup, five out of the starting eleven on the silver medal-winning Swedish national team played for Umeå IK. In 2004, Brazilian star Marta signed with the club. The club went unbeaten in the 2006 Damallsvenskan season.

After their last championship title in 2008, the club's fortunes faltered, with several high-profile players leaving and the club being forced to restructure itself to avoid bankruptcy in 2011. The re-organisation, however, was not enough to reverse the direction of the club, and after a tumultuous 2016 season which included going a month without a head coach, the club finished last in the league, and was relegated to the second division. They would spend the next three years in Elitettan before being promoted back to the top flight in 2019.

After finishing in eleventh in the 2020 Damallsvenskan season, the club was relegated again, only year after their return to the top flight. A few days after the end of the season, head coach Robert Bergström announced his resignation after four years with the club.

During the upcoming season, the team played in Elitettan, and on 9 October 2021, Umeå IK defeated IF Brommapojkarna 6–2 on home soil and qualified for the 2022 Damallsvenskan. On 5 November 2022, Umeå IK was again relegated from Damallsvenskan.

Honours
 Damallsvenskan
 Champion (7):   2000, 2001, 2002, 2005, 2006, 2007, 2008,
 Elitettan
 Champion (1):  2019
 Svenska Cupen
 Champion (4):   2001, 2002, 2003, 2007
 Svenska Supercupen
 Champion (2):   2007, 2008
 UEFA Women's Champions League
 Winners (2):  2003, 2004
 Runners-up (3) 2002, 2007, 2008

Current squad

Former players
For details of former players, see :Category:Umeå IK players.

Retired numbers

6  Malin Moström, Midfielder (1995–2006, 2007)

Record in UEFA competitions
All results (away, home and aggregate) list Umeå's goal tally first.

a First leg.

References

External links

 
Women's football clubs in Sweden
Sport in Umeå
1917 establishments in Sweden
Damallsvenskan teams
Sports clubs established in 1917